Chima may refer to:

Culture
Lego Legends of Chima, a Lego theme introduced in 2013 and discontinued in 2015
Legends of Chima, a 3D animated television series from 2013
Lego Legends of Chima Online, a 2013 MMORPG

Clothing
Chima (clothing), a type of traditional Korean skirt 
Chima jeogori, women's outfit consisting of a chima skirt and jeogori top

People
Chima Simone (born 1982), American journalist
Chima (singer) (born 1972), Nigerian born German singer
Chima Ugwu (born 1973), Nigerian shot putter
Chima Onyeike (born 1975), Dutch association football coach
Chima Okorie (born 1968), Nigerian former professional football striker for the Indian Leagues
Cinda Williams Chima (born 1952), American fantasy author

Places
 Nshima, called chima in Mozambican Portuguese
Chima (town), a town in the Santander Department of Colombia
Chimá, town and municipality located in the Córdoba Department, northern Colombia
Chima, Iran, a village in Isfahan Province, Iran

See also 

 Cheema (disambiguation)
Chika (disambiguation)